Bobby Pierce may refer to:
Bobby Pierce (baseball coach, born 1959), American college baseball coach
Bobby Pierce (racing driver) (born 1996), American dirt race car driver
Bobby Pierce (politician), American politician from Arkansas
Bobby Pierce (baseball coach, born 1978), American college baseball coach

See also
Robert Pierce (disambiguation)
Bobby Pearce (disambiguation)
Pierce (surname)